{{DISPLAYTITLE:C3H7O6P}}
The molecular formula C3H7O6P may refer to:
 Dihydroxyacetone phosphate, anion with the formula HOCH2C(O)CH2OPO32-
 Glyceraldehyde 3-phosphate, anion with the formula H(O)CCH(OH)CH2OPO32-